The Journal of Social Philosophy is a quarterly peer-reviewed academic journal of social philosophy covering work of normative and practical significance concerning social and political life. It was established in 1970 by the North American Society for Social Philosophy and is published by John Wiley & Sons. The editor-in-chief is Carol Gould (Hunter College and the Graduate Center, CUNY).

Abstracting and indexing 
The journal is abstracted and indexed in:

According to the Journal Citation Reports, the journal has a 2020 impact factor of 1.070.

See also
List of ethics journals

References

External links

Ethics journals
Wiley (publisher) academic journals
Quarterly journals
English-language journals
Social philosophy journals
Publications established in 1970